Rastislav Kužel (born 4 April 1975) is a Slovak sprint canoeist who competed in the early 2000s. He won a gold medal in the K-4 200 m event at the 2002 ICF Canoe Sprint World Championships in Seville.

Kužel also competed in the K-1 1000 m event at the 2000 Summer Olympics in Sydney, but was eliminated in the semifinals.

References

Sports-Reference.com profile

1975 births
Canoeists at the 2000 Summer Olympics
Living people
Olympic canoeists of Slovakia
Slovak male canoeists
ICF Canoe Sprint World Championships medalists in kayak